Peđa Dejanović (born 6 March 1982) is a Bosnian handball goalkeeper. Dejanović currently plays for Sloga Doboj. He was a longtime goalkeeper of Sloga Doboj. He also played for RK Goražde and Borac Banja Luka.

References

Bosnia and Herzegovina male handball players
Bosnia and Herzegovina expatriate sportspeople in Spain
People from Doboj
Living people
1982 births
Serbs of Bosnia and Herzegovina